Ba Open is a former electoral division of Fiji, one of 25 open constituencies that were elected by universal suffrage (the remaining 46 seats, called communal constituencies, were allocated by ethnicity).  Established by the 1997 Constitution, it came into being in 1999 and was used for the parliamentary elections of 1999, 2001, and 2006.  The population was predominantly Indo-Fijian and the electorate was a stronghold of the Fiji Labour Party (FLP) throughout its history.

The 2013 Constitution promulgated by the Military-backed interim government abolished all constituencies and established a form of proportional representation, with the entire country voting as a single electorate.

Election results

1999

2001

2006

Sources 
 India Abroad
 Psephos - Adam Carr's electoral archive
 Fiji Facts